Jeff(rey) or Geoff(rey) Hammond may refer to:

Jeff Hammond (actor) (born 1980), Canadian actor and director
Jeff Hammond (cricketer) (born 1950), Australian cricketer
Jeff Hammond (NASCAR) (born 1956), American sportscaster and crew chief
Jeffrey Hammond (born 1946), English musician
Geoff Hammond (footballer) (born 1950), English footballer
Geoff Hammond (volleyball), Canadian standing volleyball player
Geoffrey Hammond (tennis) in 1946 Australian Championships – Men's Singles

See also
 Jeffery Hammond (born 1959), retired United States Army general
 Jeffrey Hammonds (born 1971), American baseball player